Philip DeLara (1911–1973) was a Warner Bros. Cartoons animator and Disney comics, MGM and Hanna-Barbera artist.

As an animator, he worked on Bugs Bunny, Porky Pig and Daffy Duck and later on Speedy Gonzales, and The Tasmanian Devil, among others.
At Western Publishing, he was the main artist of Walt Disney Animation Studios's Chip 'n' Dale comics, but also drew Donald Duck, Gyro Gearloose and Uncle Scrooge as well as Mickey Mouse comics for the foreign-market Disney Studio stories.

Born in Los Angeles, California, Philip cartooned and graduated from Franklin High School and studied at the Otis Art Institute. After he studied, he drew for the Junior Times for eleven years with Cal Howard and Irv Spector. Warner Bros Cartoons was the first animation studio he worked for.

References
 Jerry Bails, The Who's Who of American comic.
 Chi é Phil Delara ?, Alberto Becattini in Zio Paperone (Italian Uncle Scrooge comic-book), 1998 [it].
 Phil DeLara by T. Lappoussière, Biography in Backup 9, 2001 (part 1) and Bibliography in Backup 12, 2002 (part 2) [fr].
 Phil DeLara in Donaldisten solohefte 1, 1983 [no].
 
Schlesinger’s Exposure Sheet 1.2

External links

Phil DeLara at the Lambiek Comiclopedia
 
Philip B Debara in the 1940 Census
Philip B Delara, Born 9/01/1911 in California

1914 births
1973 deaths
20th-century American artists
American animators
American comics artists
Disney comics artists
Warner Bros. Cartoons people